Suzanne G. Cusick (born 1954) is a music historian and musicologist living in and working in New York City, where she is a Professor of Music at the Faculty of Arts and Science at the New York University. Her specialties are  the music of seventeenth-century Italy, feminist approaches to music history and criticism, and queer studies in music.

Cusick has been in charge of editing Women and Music. A Journal of Gender and Culture, the first journal which focusses on the relationship of gender and sexuality to musical culture.

Her book Francesca Caccini at the Medici Court: Music and the Circulation of Power was published by the University of Chicago Press in 2009, for which she received the 2010 book prize of the Society for the Study of Early Modern Women. This book deals with the life and works of Francesca Caccini while in the employment of the Medici court.

Suzanne Cusick was made an honorary member of the American Musicological Society in November 2014.

See also
Women in musicology

References

http://music.as.nyu.edu/object/suzannecusick.html
http://press.uchicago.edu/ucp/books/book/chicago/F/bo5806979.html
S. CUSICK, Francesca Caccini at the Medici Court, Music and the Circulation of Power (University of Chicago Press, 2009).

Living people
Music historians
Women writers about music
21st-century American women writers
1954 births
New York University